Kenneth E. Kruszewski (born February 6, 1948) is a former Democratic member of the Pennsylvania House of Representatives.

Background
Born in the city of Erie, Pennsylvania on February 6, 1945, Kruszewski graduated from Technical Memorial High School in 1963, and attended, Pennsylvania State University, Behrend, and then also attended Mercyhurst College. Employers included the United States Justice Department and Drug Enforcement Administration, University of Delaware, Pennsylvania Chiefs Association (North West Regional Narcotics Instructor), Erie Police Department (19 years: Narcotics Commander, Detective Sergeant for 9 years).

Political career
A Democrat, he was elected to the Pennsylvania House of Representatives in 1990. He then ran an unsuccessful candidate for reelection to the House in 1992.

References

1948 births
Living people
Democratic Party members of the Pennsylvania House of Representatives
Politicians from Erie, Pennsylvania